Lord of the Barnyard is a novel by Tristan Egolf.

 Paperback: 410 pages
 Publisher:  (March 13, 2000)

Plot synopsis
Somewhere in Kentucky, perhaps Indiana, we learn via third person narration about the life of John Kaltenbrunner.

Essentially we follow the life of John and his unimaginably bad luck, until he meets a group that is even worse off - garbage men whom the town considers the lowest of the low - and so John decides to do something about it and starts up a trash-collection strike with horrific consequences.

Publication
The novel was first published in a French translation by Gallimard in 1998 before being picked by Grove Press (US) and Picador (UK) who published the original English text.

2000 American novels